Tp was a diesel-hydraulic locomotive operated by Swedish State Railways for hauling freight trains on its  narrow gauge railways. 25 were built in total, 20 by Maschinenbau Kiel and five on licence by Svenska Järnvägsverkstäderna (The Swedish Railway Workshops).

During the 1960s most of the narrow gauge railways were converted to standard gauge, and SJ chose to rebuild the locomotives to this gauge, and also change the axle system to D, giving them the designation T23. Of the remaining ten Tps, six were scrapped in the 1970s while the last four remained in service until the 1980s. The latter have all been preserved.

External links
 Järnväg.net on Tp

MaK locomotives
Tp
D locomotives
891 mm gauge railways in Sweden
Standard gauge locomotives of Sweden